Jeremy Rabb (born January 28, 1970) is an American stage and screen actor.

Early life and education 
Rabb was born in Princeton, New Jersey. His father, Theodore K. Rabb, was a historian and professor at Princeton University. Jeremy graduated from the Institute for Advanced Theater Training at Harvard University.

Career 
Between 2005 and 2007, Rabb had a recurring role as an ER resident on the television series Grey's Anatomy. He performed in the William Shakespeare comedy Twelfth Night, or What You Will with A Noise Within, a Pasadena-based theatrical company.

Filmography

Film

Television

References

External links

1970 births
People from Princeton, New Jersey
Male actors from New Jersey
American male stage actors
American male television actors
Harvard University alumni
Living people